Ebrietas is a genus of skippers in the family Hesperiidae found in the Neotropical ecoczone.

Species
Listed alphabetically.
Ebrietas anacreon (Staudinger, 1876) – common bentwing
Ebrietas badia (Plötz, 1884)
Ebrietas elaudia (Plötz, 1884) – plain bentwing
Ebrietas evanidus Mabille, 1898 – blurred bentwing
Ebrietas infanda (Butler, 1877)
Ebrietas osyris (Staudinger, 1876) – great bentwing
Ebrietas sappho Steinhauser, 1974 – Sappho bentwing

References

Natural History Museum Lepidoptera genus database

Erynnini
Hesperiidae genera
Taxa named by Frederick DuCane Godman
Taxa named by Osbert Salvin